Paul R. Howe (born 1959) is an American former special operations soldier. He was a Delta Force team leader who was involved with special operations as a U.S. Army soldier. He was involved in the special operations rescue at the Battle of Mogadishu (1993) which led to the book Black Hawk Down: A Story of Modern War and the Black Hawk Down film. He is a firearms instructor and counterterrorism expert who trains people in high-risk operations. His company is called CSAT-Combat Shooting and Tactics. He is the author of three books about leadership.

Military career 

Howe served 20 years in the U.S. Army. He held the rank of Master Sergeant and was a member of the Delta Force. For ten of those years he was involved in special operations. He fought in the 1993 Battle of Mogadishu.

His experiences in Mogadishu were portrayed in the film Black Hawk Down. Howe provided much of the information about the Delta Force operations for the writing of the 1999 book: Black Hawk Down: A Story of Modern War. He was the leader of the assault team that went in to rescue Army Rangers and Delta Force members in Mogadishu. Mark Bowden met with Howe in 1997 about writing the book after clearing it with Howe's commanding officer. Howe was first to arrive on the scene of the downed Black Hawk helicopter. Other Delta Force members were also consulted for the book, but they did not allow the use of their real names. Howe has faced some criticism for allowing Bowden to use his real name.

Career 
In 2000 Howe graduated with an MIS (Masters of Interdisciplinary Studies) from Stephen F. Austin State University. After his 20-year military career Howe became an instructor specializing in high-risk training for law enforcement. He works as a professional instructor and runs Combat Shooting & Tactics (CSAT) which is a training facility in Nacogdoches, Texas. He started the company in 2000.

When the September 11 attacks occurred in 2001 there was a demand for counterterrorism instruction. Howe served as an instructor for a counterterrorism company: The HALO Corporation International. The company employed former military special forces members as instructors. Howe taught hostage rescue and firearms training. Howe also focuses on hostage rescue when training law enforcement and SWAT teams.

Personal life 
Howe is married to Constance "Connie" (née Beckwith), a former Army Reserve major and the daughter of Delta Force founder, Col. Charles Alvin Beckwith. His daughter, U.S. Air Force Technical Sergeant Mary Howe (Now Daniell), is an aerial gunner with the 4th Special Operations Squadron. He lives and works in Nacogdoches, Texas.

Paul Howe signature firearms 
LWRC International M6A1-S 5.56 CSAT EVO 1.0 Paul Howe Limited Edition
Wilson Combat Paul Howe G19
Wilson Combat The Paul Howe Tactical Carbine

Books

References

External links 
The Battle of The Black Sea: MSG Paul Howe's Untold Story of Black Hawk Down
Paul Howe biography Archived

1959 births
Living people
Stephen F. Austin State University alumni
Military personnel from Texas
Delta Force
Battle of Mogadishu (1993)